Dryocosmus are a genus of gall wasps. They are cyclically parthenogenetic insects that induce galls on plants in the family Fagaceae. 

According to recent studies, the genus includes some species previously considered as belonging to the genus Chilaspis, whereas Dryocosmus favus should be excluded of the genus. Dryocosmus and Chilaspis are closely related to the other oak gall wasp taxa (Aphelonyx, Plagiotrochus, Pseudoneuroterus, Trichagalma, and some Neuroterus species)

Dryocosmus kuriphilus is an invasive species in Europe and North America (originating from Asia) that endangers the chestnut trees.

Species
 Dryocosmus archboldi Melika & Abrahamson, 2021
 Dryocosmus asymmetricus (split twig gall wasp)
 Dryocosmus caspiensis
 Dryocosmus cerriphilus
 Dryocosmus deciduus
 Dryocosmus dubiosus (two-horned gall wasp)
 Dryocosmus floridensis
 Dryocosmus imbricariae (banded bullet gall wasp)
 Dryocosmus israeli
 Dryocosmus jungalii
 Dryocosmus kuriphilus Yasumatsu, 1951
 Dryocosmus mayri
 Dryocosmus mikoi
 Dryocosmus minusculus (pumpkin gall wasp)
 Dryocosmus nervosus
 Dryocosmus nitidus
 Dryocosmus quercuspalustris (Osten Sacken, 1861) (succulent oak gall wasp)
 Dryocosmus rileyi

References

Cynipidae
Hymenoptera genera
Gall-inducing insects